Alpago is a comune (municipality) in the Province of Belluno in the Italian region of Veneto. Lago di Santa Croce is located near Alpago.

It was established on 23 February 2016 by the merger of the municipalities of Farra d'Alpago, Pieve d'Alpago and Puos d'Alpago.

Twin towns
 Kalvarija, Lithuania

References

Cities and towns in Veneto